Yo canto is the debut album by Spanish recording artist Julio Iglesias, released in 1969. The album spent 15 weeks in the Spanish charts, and peaked at No. 3. The album generated four hit singles in the Spanish charts.

Track listing

References

External links
 Julio Iglesias discography

1969 debut albums
Julio Iglesias albums
Spanish-language albums
Columbia Records albums